Michael John Cooper (born 8 October 1999) is a professional footballer who plays as a goalkeeper for Plymouth Argyle.

Club career 
Michael Cooper made his professional debut in a League One game away to Blackburn Rovers aged 18 years and 6 days old. With starting goalkeeper Kyle Letheren going off injured, Cooper came on for the second half, as the game finished 1–1. He was also a key member of the Plymouth Argyle Youth Team who reached the last 16 of the FA Youth Cup, making crucial saves in victories over Manchester City and Burnley in 3rd and 4th rounds of the competition.

On 17 December 2019, Cooper signed a new long-term deal at Plymouth Argyle, until the end of the 2021–22 season.

On 5 September 2020, Cooper started in the first match of the Argyle season, playing Queens Park Rangers in the first round of the EFL Cup. Argyle won 3–2 after a spectacular performance from Cooper. Cooper held onto the starting position for the 2020–21 season.

In April 2021, Cooper signed a new long-term deal with Argyle, signing on until 2024. He was also voted Young Player of the Season 2020–21 by Plymouth Argyle supporters, coming second in the senior vote to squad Vice-Captain, Joe Edwards.

The following season he received the EFL League One Golden Glove (jointly with Wycombe's David Stockdale) for keeping the most clean sheets, having kept 18 clean sheets across 46 league games. He was also named as Plymouth's Player of the Season and in the PFA League One Team of the Year.

Honours 
Individual

 EFL Golden Glove: League One 2021–22
 PFA League One Team of the Year: 2021–22
 Plymouth Argyle Young Player of the Season: 2020–21
 Plymouth Argyle Player of the Season: 2021–22

References

External links 

1999 births
Living people
Association football goalkeepers
English footballers
Plymouth Argyle F.C. players
English Football League players
Sportspeople from Exeter